Taxitheliella richardsii is a species of moss in the family Pylaisiadelphaceae. It is endemic to Borneo where it is confined to Sarawak. Its natural habitat is subtropical or tropical dry forests. It is threatened by habitat loss.

References

Hypnales
Endemic flora of Borneo
Flora of Sarawak
Critically endangered plants
Taxonomy articles created by Polbot